The Jakanachari Award is a state award of Karnataka conferred on talented sculptors and craftsmen from the state. These awards are given away every year by the government of Karnataka to celebrate the contributions of the legendary sculptor Amarashilpi Jakanachari.

Awardees

References

Civil awards and decorations of Karnataka
Indian art awards
Karnataka-related lists
1922 establishments in India
Awards established in 1922